I Don't Care: The Album is the second and final studio album by American hip hop duo Audio Two. It was released in 1990 through First Priority Music with distribution by Atlantic Records. Production was handled by its members Milk Dee and DJ Gizmo along with the King of Chill and Terence Dudley. It features guest appearances from MC Lyte and Positive K. I Don't Care: The Album was not a success, only peaking at number 74 on the Top R&B/Hip-Hop Albums chart and spawning two singles: "On the Road Again" and "I Get the Papers". Its lead single, "On the Road Again", peaked at number 16 on the Hot Rap Songs chart.

A third studio album entitled First Dead Indian was set to be released in 1992 but was scrapped prior to its release and the duo would disband soon after, leaving I Don't Care: The Album as their final LP.

Track listing

Personnel
Nathaniel V. "DJ Gizmo" Robinson Jr. – main artist, producer (tracks: 2, 4-8, 10-14), co-producer (track 1), programming, engineering, mixing (tracks: 1-2, 4-8, 10-14)
Kirk S. "Milk Dee" Robinson – main artist, producer (tracks: 2, 4-8, 10-14), co-producer (track 1), programming, engineering, mixing (tracks: 1-2, 4-8, 10-14)
Lana Michelle "MC Lyte" Moorer – vocals (tracks: 8, 12)
Darryl "Positive K" Gibson – vocals (track 8)
Freddie "The King Of Chill" Byrd – additional vocals (tracks: 5, 9, 13), producer & mixing (tracks: 3, 9)
Guy Routte – additional vocals (track 6)
Antoinette Guillopo – additional vocals (track 11)
Madelline Serrano – additional vocals (track 11)
DJ K-Rock – additional vocals (track 13)
Terence Quentin Dudley – producer (track 1)
El Bravador – co-producer (track 11)
Nat Robinson, Sr. – executive producer, management
Carlton S. Batts – mastering
Bob Defrin – art direction
Lynn Kowalewski – design
Jamie Christian – sleeve notes

Chart history

References

External links
 

1990 albums
Audio Two albums
Atlantic Records albums